Jolles is a surname and may apply to:

 Henry Jolles, German/Brazilian classical pianist
 Sir John Jolles, Lord Mayor of London in 1615
 Marion Jolles, sports announcer
 Muriel Jolles, a candidate in the Harlow Council elections of 2003, 2004, 2006, and 2008
 O. J. Matthijs Jolles, professor of German who translated Clausewitz's On War into English
 Simon Jolles, Chief Rabbi of Hungary ca. 1717

Jolles